The Spanish Rugby Federation is the governing body for the sport of rugby union in Spain.

The Spanish Rugby Federation was founded in 1923, and joined the International Rugby Football Board, later known as the International Rugby Board and now as World Rugby, in 1988. It is located in Madrid.

See also

 Spain national rugby union team
 Spain national rugby sevens team
 Rugby union in Spain
 División de Honor de Rugby (Spain's top tier domestic rugby union competition)
División de Honor B de Rugby (Spain's second tier domestic rugby union competition)

External links
  Official Site

Rugby
Rugby union in Spain
Rugby union governing bodies in Europe
World Rugby members
Sports organizations established in 1923
1923 establishments in Spain